Justine M'Poyo Kasa-Vubu (born 14 April 1951) is a Congolese politician and leader of a small political party, the Movement of the Congolese Democrats (Mouvement des démocrates congolais), for whom she stood as a Presidential candidate in the 2006 elections.

Life
She is the daughter of Joseph Kasa-Vubu, the first president of the Democratic Republic of the Congo.

She was a candidate in the Congolese presidential elections of July 2006, but obtained only 0.44% of the votes in the first round.

After her father died and Joseph-Désiré Mobutu took over, she went into exile with the rest of her family, first to Algeria and then to Switzerland, where she finished her studies. She wound up living in Belgium and there graduated from the Catholic University of Louvain (UCL). She worked in Geneva for the High Commissioner for the Refugees of the UN. She went back to Belgium to continue her work at the Centre for Research on the Epidemiology of Disasters and in Central African studies at the Université libre de Bruxelles (ULB).

In 1991, she joined the Union for Democracy and Social Progress (UDPS) of Étienne Tshisekedi, the main opposition party to Joseph Mobutu. On 22 May 1997, she was appointed Minister of the Civil Service in the first government of Laurent-Désiré Kabila. She was appointed ambassador of the Democratic Republic of the Congo to Belgium. She resigned after disagreements with Laurent-Désiré Kabila.

In 2013, she was a member of the Mouvement des Démocrates party. Unlike other opposition parties, she was prepared to hold discussions with Kabila.

Works 
 Joseph Kasa-Vubu mon père : de la naissance d’une conscience nationale à l’indépendance, Bruxelles, s.n., 1985.
 Kasa-Vubu et le Congo indépendant (1960-1969), Bruxelles, LeCri, 1997. 
 Douze mois chez Kabila, Bruxelles, Le Cri, 1999. 
 Sommes-nous décolonisés?, Paris-Bruxelles, Castells – Labor, 2000.

References

External links

http://www.justine-mpoyo-kasa-vubu.com
http://www.voiceofcongo.net/rdc-justine-kasa-vubu-met-en-garde-le-pgr-kabange-numbi-sur-lapplication-de-larticle-64
https://web.archive.org/web/20120318092926/http://www.congonline.com/Politiq/PerJustine.htm
https://emmanuel1ngeleka.wordpress.com/2014/05/15/justine-kasa-vubu-triste-fin-dune-femme-tres-pressee/

 

1951 births
Women government ministers of the Democratic Republic of the Congo
Living people
People from Kinshasa
Kongo people
Democratic Republic of the Congo exiles
Université libre de Bruxelles alumni
Université catholique de Louvain alumni
Government ministers of the Democratic Republic of the Congo
Candidates for President of the Democratic Republic of the Congo
Ambassadors of the Democratic Republic of the Congo to Belgium
Democratic Republic of the Congo women diplomats
Women ambassadors
21st-century Democratic Republic of the Congo people
21st-century Democratic Republic of the Congo women politicians
21st-century Democratic Republic of the Congo politicians